This is a list of episodes for the ABC television sitcom Full House. In total, there were 192 episodes filmed for the show over the course of its eight seasons from 1987 to 1995.

Full House chronicles a widowed father's struggles of raising his three young daughters and the lives that they touch. The patriarch of the family, Danny (Bob Saget), invites his brother-in-law, Jesse (John Stamos), and his best friend, Joey (Dave Coulier), to help raise his children (Candace Cameron, Jodie Sweetin, and Mary Kate/Ashley Olsen), after his wife was killed in an automobile accident. In season four, Jesse marries Becky (Lori Loughlin), and they move into the attic. Then, in season five, Becky and Jesse have twin boys named Nicky and Alex (Daniel and Kevin Renteria/Blake and Dylan Tuomy-Wilhoit). The series ends with episode 192, the two-part "Michelle Rides Again". The stories are generally based around a moral message.

Series overview

Episodes

Season 1 (1987–88)

Season 2 (1988–89)

Season 3 (1989–90) 

The episode 11 season 3 (Aftershocks) was written after the 1989 Earthquake. Its scenario was designed to help kids of the San Francisco Bay Area deal with the trauma of the earthquake.

Season 4 (1990–91)

Season 5 (1991–92)

Season 6 (1992–93)

Season 7 (1993–94)

Season 8 (1994–95)

References 

General references 
 
 

Episodes
Lists of American sitcom episodes